Josef Muskita (28 July 1924 – 1 March 2006) was an Indonesian sailor. He competed in the Dragon event at the 1960 Summer Olympics.

References

External links
 

1924 births
2006 deaths
Indonesian male sailors (sport)
Olympic sailors of Indonesia
Sailors at the 1960 Summer Olympics – Dragon
People from Magelang
20th-century Indonesian people